Another State of Mind is a documentary film made in the summer of 1982 chronicling the adventure of two punk bands, Social Distortion and Youth Brigade, as they embark on their first international tour. Along the way they meet up with another progressive punk band, Minor Threat, whom they hang out with at the Dischord house for about a week near the end of their ill-fated tour.

Plot
The bands head north up through San Francisco, Oregon, and Seattle. The film documents Social Distortion and Youth Brigade live shows; it also features Minor Threat at band practice. At one point in the movie, Social Distortion's Mike Ness sits on a porch and writes future underground hit "Another State of Mind". The film documents not only the complex and challenging social dynamics of the punk scene, the touring bands, and their crew, but also documents the DIY punk touring circuit in its infancy.

A final bus break-down in D.C. causes Social Distortion to split up. Liles and Danell abandon the group to stay with friends of Brinson's, where they voice their exhaustion with the tour and the rest of the group. Out of desperation, the others go to the local Kmart to shop for tarps with the members of Minor Threat.

Mike Ness ends up being stranded when the rest of Social Distortion heads back to OC where they feel they have a better chance of making money rather than staying on the difficult tour. Ness has really no choice but to grab a flight back to LA himself and try to regroup. Youth Brigade rents a truck and drives back to Los Angeles.

Cast
Adam Stern, bass player for Youth Brigade
Mark Stern, drummer for Youth Brigade
Shawn Stern, guitar and lead vocals for Youth Brigade
Mike Ness as the lead vocals, lead guitar of Social Distortion
Dennis Danell as the rhythm guitar of Social Distortion
Brent Liles (credited as Brent Lyle) as the bass guitar of Social Distortion
Derek O'Brien as the drummer of Social Distortion
 Mark Wilson (Monk Rock) as a band manager
 Mike Brinson "Rock Star Roadie" as party fill
 Louis Dufau, roadie
 Marlon Whitfield, roadie

Production
Filmmakers Peter Stuart and Adam Small came upon a large-scale project which immediately captured their imagination: the Better Youth Organization of Los Angeles was planning a North American tour. Eleven assorted punks would be traveling across the country in a broken down school bus. It was a chance to explore and document the punk community more extensively than ever before.

On August 17, 1982, armed with one production assistant, Stuart and Small set off in their rental truck on this journey through the underground. For six weeks and ten thousand miles, they recorded the adventures of the two touring bands – Youth Brigade and Social Distortion. More than just concert footage, this film documents the rich collection of characters in and around the tour, and the hardships and dangers of life on the road. The film was made on the cheap side and the scenes that feature instructions for slam dancing were filmed as filler so that the film would be at a viable length for release and distribution.

The poster was designed by Josh Freeman, now president and creative director of FreeAssociates, the design/advertising agency in Los Angeles.

DVD special features
Commentaries by Mike Ness, the directors and Youth Brigade.

Trivia
Four cast members have died since the making of this film; Dennis Danell (brain aneurysm in 2000) and Brent Liles (traffic accident in 2007) of Social Distortion, and road crew members Louis Dufau (drug overdose in 1988) and Social Distortion manager/road crew member Monk (Mark Wilson) died in 
April 2020. Additionally, Marcel, a wheelchair-using punk who is shown in the Montreal scene died in 1984. Manon Brière, another young Montreal punk, is still around and she fronted bands Generatorz and Maninc Manon and the Guest List.
In the mid 1980s Mike Brinson went to nuclear engineering school in the Navy. He currently resides in Indiana where he has 2 sons and works in the aerospace industry.

Strangely, in the beginning of the documentary, Dennis Danell jokingly says that he's 38 and old. On February 29, 2000, Danell died at the age of 38.

References

External links 

1984 films
Documentary films about punk music and musicians
American documentary films
Social Distortion
1984 documentary films
1980s English-language films
1980s American films